The Archdiocese of Gniezno is the oldest Latin Catholic archdiocese in Poland, located in the city of Gniezno. The ecclesiastical province comprises the suffragan dioceses of Bydgoszcz and Włocławek.

History

The Metropolitan Archdiocese of Gniezno was established in 1000 AD on the initiative of the Polish duke Bolesław I the Brave. He had the relics of the missionary and martyr Adalbert of Prague (Wojciech) transferred to Gniezno Cathedral, which soon became a major pilgrimage site. Here Bolesław met with Emperor Otto III in the Congress of Gniezno, where the duke obtained investiture rights and created the Gniezno archbishopric, superseding the older Diocese of Poznań. Led by Adalbert's half-brother Radim Gaudentius, the ecclesiastical province then comprised the suffragan dioceses in Kraków, Wrocław, and Kołobrzeg (extinct in 1015), and from about 1075 also Poznań.

The position of the archbishops and their suffragans was confirmed in the 1136 Bull of Gniezno issued by Pope Innocent II. The Gniezno metropolitans held the right to crown the Kings of Poland and in 1412 obtained the status of a Primate of Poland. From 1572, they acted as interrex regents of the Polish–Lithuanian Commonwealth.

When on 16 July 1821 the Diocese of Wrocław was put under direct authority of the Holy See by Pope Pius VII, Gniezno was affiliated in personal union (aeque principaliter) with the Archdiocese of Poznań. The union of Poznań and Gniezno was again dissolved with effect from 12 November 1948, when a personal union (in persona episcopi) between the Archdiocese of Warsaw and Gniezno was established. By Apostolic constitution of 25 March 1992, Pope John Paul II again divided the union between the archdioceses of Gniezno and Warsaw.

Special churches
Minor Basilicas:
 Bazylika św. Apostołów Piotra i Pawła, Kruszwica
 Bazylika Wniebowzięcia Najświętszej Marii Panny, Trzemeszno

Leadership
 List of archbishops of Gniezno and primates of Poland

Suffragan dioceses
 Bydgoszcz, established in 2004
 Włocławek, established about 1015 (split off Kołobrzeg as Diocese of Kujawy–Pomorze), interrupted 1818–1925 (then suffragan of Warsaw as Diocese of Kujawy–Kalisz)

Former suffragans
 Diocese of Krakow, 1000–1807, became suffragan of Lwów (Lviv), suffragan of Warsaw in 1818, raised to archbishopric in 1925
 Diocese of Wrocław, 1000–1821 (exempt), raised to archbishopric in 1930
 Diocese of Kołobrzeg, 1000–1007 (Bishop Reinbern), re-established as suffragan diocese of Koszalin-Kołobrzeg in 1972, became suffragan of Szczecin-Kamień in 1992
 Diocese of Poznań, 1075–1821, raised to archbishopric, in personal union with Gniezno until 1946
 Diocese of Płock, 1075–1818, suffragan of Warsaw
 Diocese of Lubusz (Lebus), established about 1125, suffragan of Magdeburg from 1424, secularised in 1598
 Diocese of Vilnius, 1388–1798, raised to archbishopric in 1926
 Diocese of Samogitia, established in 1427, dissolved in 1798, re-established in 1849, raised to archbishopric (Archdiocese of Kaunas) in 1926
 Diocese of Warsaw, 1798-1813, raised to archbishopric, in personal union with Gniezno 1946-1992
 Diocese of Chełmno, 1821–1992, de facto already joining Gniezno councils since 1566, replaced by the Diocese of Pelplin, suffragan of Gdańsk (see below)
 Diocese of Łuck (Lutsk), 16th century, united with Diocese of Kyiv–Černihiv in 1798
 Diocese of Inflanty (Wenden), 1621–1798
 Diocese of Smolensk, 1636–1783, merged into Archdiocese of Mohilev in 1818
 Diocese of Gdańsk, established in 1925 (exempt), suffragan of Gniezno from 1972, raised to archbishopric in 1992
 Diocese of Szczecin-Kamień, established in 1972, raised to archbishopric in 1992

See also
Roman Catholicism in Poland

References

  Diocese website

1000 establishments in Europe
Roman Catholic dioceses in Poland
Gniezno
Roman Catholic Archdiocese of Gniezno
Dioceses established in the 10th century
Roman Catholic Archdiocese of Gniezno